Cresera affinis is a moth of the family Erebidae first described by Walter Rothschild in 1909. It is found in French Guiana, Ecuador, Peru, Amazonas and Guyana.

References

Moths described in 1909
Phaegopterina